Orient Express is a 1943 Hungarian drama film directed by László Cserépy and starring Andor Ajtay, Irén Pelsöczy and Gyula Csortos. It is based on a play by Andor Matolcsy about events taking place on the Orient Express.

Cast
 Andor Ajtay ...  Szilágyi Péter
 Irén Pelsöczy ...  Török lánya
 Gyula Csortos ...  Török Samu
 Piri Vaszary ...  Török felesége
 Sándor Pethes ...  Boda Géza
 Nusi Somogyi ...  Bodáné
 Géza Berczy ...  Filmszínész

External links

1943 films
1940s Hungarian-language films
Films directed by László Cserépy
Films set on the Orient Express
Hungarian drama films
1943 drama films